Salix jejuna, the barrens willow, is a tiny willow restricted to a 30 km stretch of coastal barren lands of the Strait of Belle Isle on the Great Northern Peninsula of Newfoundland. It was first found in Labrador by Archibald Gowanlock Huntsman in 1923 and then by Merritt Lyndon Fernald, Karl McKay Wiegand, and Long in 1925. It grows in highly restricted limestone barrens where limestone crevices are found among thin soils that conceal fields of fissured limestone. It is characterized by small rounded leaves on short petioles growing close to the stems. The plant's growth architecture is twiggy flat mats that sprawl over the surface. Mats can extend to 30 cm in a couple of years. It flowers in late June to mid-July. Barrens willow's low-growing habit and spreading form allows it to take advantage of the sun-heated soil boundary and persist in harsh conditions including wind, wind-entrained ice, and soil frost heaving.  Like all willows, it is a pioneer species.

Salix jejuna is considered critically endangered. It was assessed by the Committee on the Status of Endangered Wildlife in Canada (COSEWIC) in 2001 and determined to be an endangered species as listed in the Newfoundland and Labrador Endangered Species Act and the Canadian federal Species at Risk Act in 2002.

References 

Plants described in 1926
jejuna
Flora of Newfoundland
Endemic flora of Canada
Flora without expected TNC conservation status